The Dewoitine D.7 was a French sport plane built in the mid 1920s.

Development

The D.7 was a conventionally laid-out monoplane, with a thick cantilever shoulder wing.  Its single seat, open cockpit,  provided with a small windscreen, was over the wing. It had conventional, fixed, tailskid landing gear.

The D.7 could be powered by any small engine; the Salmson AD.3 radial engine, the Clerget 2K flat twin, Vaslin flat-four or Vaslin water-cooled six cylinder inline engines were fitted.

Operators

 One aircraft was sold to the Japanese Army.

Specifications (AD.3 engine)

References

 
Aviafrance website/Dewoitine

1920s French sport aircraft
D.007
Mid-wing aircraft
Single-engined tractor aircraft
Aircraft first flown in 1924